The Jacob Hanmer White House at 599 E. One Hundred S in Pleasant Grove, Utah, United States, was built in 1874.  It is built of soft rock.  It was listed on the National Register of Historic Places in 1987.

References

Houses completed in 1874
Houses in Utah County, Utah
Houses on the National Register of Historic Places in Utah
National Register of Historic Places in Utah County, Utah
Buildings and structures in Pleasant Grove, Utah